The men's 5000 metres race of the 2015–16 ISU Speed Skating World Cup 4, arranged in the Thialf arena in Heerenveen, Netherlands, was held on 12 December 2015.

Sven Kramer of the Netherlands won the race, while compatriot Jorrit Bergsma came second, and Bart Swings of Belgium came third. Jonas Pflug of Germany won the Division B race.

Results
The race took place on Saturday, 12 December, with Division B scheduled in the morning session, at 11:32, and Division A scheduled in the afternoon session, at 14:46.

Division A

Division B

References

Men 5000
4